Biswabhusan Harichandan (born 3 August 1934) is an Indian politician serving as the 8th and current Governor of Chhattisgarh. He was former Governor of Andhra Pradesh from 2019 to early 2023.

From 2004–2009, he was Minister of Law, Revenue and Fisheries, Government of Odisha.

Life and career
Harichandan joined Bharatiya Jana Sangha in 1971 and became its National Executive Member and its State General Secretary until the formation of Janata Party in 1977. During the era of emergency he was detained under the MISA Act. After the formation of BJP in 1980, he was appointed the President of the state until 1988 before he joined hands with Janata Dal. He went back to BJP in 1996.

Harichandan was elected to the Odisha State Legislative Assembly five times. Beginning from 1977 assembly elections from Chilika assembly as a member of BJP, he came back to power in 1990 with a Janata Dal ticket. Harichandan was elected for the third time, this time from Bhubaneswar Central seat in the by-poll elections of 1997, and continued to be a member from the same constituency three times in a row. He was also a cabinet minister in the BJD-BJP led coalition government in 2004.

In July 2019, he was appointed the 23rd Governor of Andhra Pradesh.

Personal life 
On 17 November 2021, Harichandan was diagnosed with COVID-19.

Awards 
Harichandan was awarded the Kalinga Ratna Award in 2021.

Books
Harichandan has authored several books some of which include Marubataas, Mahasangramar Mahanayak, Buxi Jagabandhu, Paika Mutiny and his autobiography Sangarsha Sarinahin.

References

|-

1934 births
Living people
Governors of Andhra Pradesh
Odia-language writers
Indians imprisoned during the Emergency (India)
Bharatiya Jana Sangh politicians
Janata Party politicians
Janata Dal politicians
Bharatiya Janata Party politicians from Odisha
Odisha MLAs 1977–1980
Members of the Odisha Legislative Assembly
People from Bhubaneswar